Segment or segmentation may refer to:

Biology
Segmentation (biology), the division of body plans into a series of repetitive segments
Segmentation in the human nervous system
Internodal segment, the portion of a nerve fiber between two Nodes of Ranvier
Segment, in fruit anatomy, a section of a citrus fruit
Parts of a genome, especially in virology

Computing and communications
Memory segmentation, the division of computer memory into segments
Segment descriptor
Data segment
Code segment
Image segmentation, the process of partitioning a digital image into multiple segments
Time-series segmentation, the process of partitioning a time-series into a sequence of discrete segments in order to reveal the underlying properties of its source
Network segmentation, splitting a computer network into subnetworks
Network segment
Packet segmentation, the process of dividing a data packet into smaller units 
Segmentation and reassembly
TCP segmentation, the process of dividing a data stream into segments for transmission
Segment architecture, a detailed, formal description of areas within an enterprise

Geometry 
Line segment, part of a line bounded by two end points
Circular segment, the region of a circle cut off from the rest by a secant or chord
Spherical segment, the solid defined by cutting a sphere with a pair of parallel planes
Arc (geometry), a closed segment of a differentiable curve

Language and linguistics
Segment (handwriting), the pen-tip trajectory between two defined points
Segment (linguistics), a discrete unit of speech
Speech segmentation, identifying the boundaries between words in spoken languages
Text segmentation, dividing written text into meaningful units

Other uses
Segmentary lineage, a model in social anthropology
Market segmentation, dividing a broad market into sub-groups of consumers
Euro Car Segment, EU descriptions of car types

See also
 
 
 Part (disambiguation)
 Division (disambiguation)
 Section (disambiguation)
 Subdivision (disambiguation)
 Annelid, a segmented worm